Kilmurry GAA is a Gaelic football club based in the village and parish of Kilmurry, Cork, Ireland. The club plays in the division of Muskerry of Cork GAA . It currently fields teams from Junior A down to under 10.

The club share its facilities with its sister club, St Val's Ladies Gaelic Football club who operate in the senior grade of the Cork Ladies football championship. Another sister club in the parish is Cloughduv Hurling Club who also compete in the Junior A grade in the Muskerry division.

History
The club was founded in 1875, making it one of the earliest clubs to be founded. In 1884, after the foundation of the Gaelic Athletic Association, the club joined the GAA.

The club struggled for a long time to field a senior team, playing as a amalgamation with Canovee GAA, for most of the 1910s.

Achievements
 Cork Senior Football Championship Runners-Up 1892
 Cork Intermediate Football Championship 1 title 1933  Runners-Up 1925, 1928, 1932, 1992, 1995
 Intermediate Football League - Winners (2) 1990, 1994
 Cork Junior Football Championship 5 titles - 1924, 1969, 1980, 1986, 2022  Runners-Up 2012
 Cork Minor Football Championship Winners (1) 1939
 Cork Minor B Football Championship 2 titles 2006, 2009  Runners-Up 1986
 Mid Cork Junior A Football Championship - 10 titles  1931, 1969, 1978, 1980, 1984, 1986, 2012,  2014  2016, 2017, 2022 Runners-Up 1926, 1927, 1934, 1939, 1944, 1947, 1966, 1967, 1968, 1979, 1985, 2013
 Mid Cork Under-21 A Football Championship Winners 2018

References

External sources
 Club website

Gaelic football clubs in County Cork
Gaelic games clubs in County Cork
1875 establishments in Ireland
Gaelic Athletic Association clubs established in 1875